Abu Hena Bablu is a Bangladeshi Cinematographer. He won the Bangladesh National Film Award for Best Cinematography for the films Pita Mata Sontan (1991).

Selected films
 Garmil - 1976
 Oshikkhito - 1978
 Gangchil - 1980
 Qurbani - 1985
 Ashanti - 1986
 Lalu Mastan - 1987
 Pita Mata Sontan - 1991
 Lokkhir Songsar - 1992
 Katha Dao - 1997

Awards and nominations
National Film Awards

References

External links
 
 

Bangladeshi cinematographers
Best Cinematographer National Film Award (Bangladesh) winners